Pol-e Sharqi (also Romanized as Pol-e Sharqī; also known as Pahel) is a village in Khamir Rural District, in the Central District of Khamir County, Hormozgan Province, Iran. At the 2006 census, its population was 4,585, in 901 families.

References 

Populated places in Khamir County